Major Francis Edward Henry Farquharson VC (25 March 1837 – 12 September 1875) was a Scottish recipient of the Victoria Cross, the highest and most prestigious award for gallantry in the face of the enemy that can be awarded to British and Commonwealth forces.

Early life

He was born in Glasgow on 25 March 1837 the son of Robert Farquharson, a thread manufacturer living at 7 St James Place.

Details
He was 20 years old, and a lieutenant in the 42nd Regiment of Foot (later The Black Watch (Royal Highlanders)), British Army during the Indian Mutiny when the following deed took place on 9 March 1858 at Lucknow, India for which he was awarded the VC:

Later life
He later achieved the rank of major.

He fell ill during the Ashanti campaign of 1874 and retired from active service. He died at Dundrige in Harberton in Devonshire on 12 September 1875. He is buried a few metres east of the entrance to St Andrew's Church in Harberton.A stained glass window to his memory lies within the church.

His Victoria Cross is displayed at the Black Watch Museum in Perth, Scotland together with his four other campaign medals: the Crimea Medal (Sebastopol); Indian Mutiny Medal (Lucknow); Ashanti Medal (Coomassie); and the Turkish Crimea Medal.

Artistic Recognition

He was painted with fellow officers by Orlando Norie.

References

Monuments to Courage (David Harvey, 1999)
The Register of the Victoria Cross (This England, 1997)
Scotland's Forgotten Valour (Graham Ross, 1995)

External links

Location of grave and VC medal (Devonshire)
 

1837 births
1875 deaths
Military personnel from Glasgow
British recipients of the Victoria Cross
Indian Rebellion of 1857 recipients of the Victoria Cross
42nd Regiment of Foot officers
British Army personnel of the Crimean War
British military personnel of the Third Anglo-Ashanti War
British Army recipients of the Victoria Cross